Karslı is a village in the District of Seyhan, Adana Province, Turkey.

References

Villages in Seyhan District